Yaphet Frederick Kotto (born Frederick Samuel Kotto; November 15, 1939 – March 15, 2021) was an American actor known for numerous film roles, as well as starring in the NBC television series Homicide: Life on the Street (1993–1999) as Lieutenant Al Giardello. His most well-known films include the science-fiction horror film Alien (1979), the science-fiction action film The Running Man (1987), the James Bond film Live and Let Die (1973), in which he portrayed the main villain Dr. Kananga, and the comedy thriller Midnight Run (1988) opposite Robert De Niro.

Early life
Kotto was born Frederick Samuel Kotto in New York City. His mother, Gladys Marie, was an American nurse and U.S. Army officer of Panamanian and West Indian descent. His father, Yaphet Avraham Kotto (who was, according to his son, originally named Njoki Manga Bell), was a businessman from Cameroon who emigrated to the United States in the 1920s. Kotto's father was raised Jewish and his mother converted to Judaism. The couple separated when Kotto was a child, and he was raised by his maternal grandparents.

Career
By the age of 16, Kotto was studying acting at the Actors Mobile Theater Studio, and at 19, he made his professional acting debut in Othello. He was a member of the Actors Studio in New York. Kotto got his start in acting on Broadway, where he appeared in The Great White Hope, among other productions.

His film debut was in 1963, aged 23, in an uncredited role in 4 for Texas. He performed in Michael Roemer's Nothing but a Man (1964) and played a supporting role in the caper film The Thomas Crown Affair (1968). He played John Auston, a confused Marine Lance Corporal, in the 1968 episode "King of the Hill", on the first season of Hawaii Five-O.

In 1967 he released a single, "Have You Ever Seen the Blues" / "Have You Dug His Scene" (Chisa Records, CH006).

In 1973 he landed the role of the James Bond villain Mr. Big in Live and Let Die, as well as roles in Across 110th Street and Truck Turner. He played a police officer, Richard "Crunch" Blackstone, in the 1975 film Report to the Commissioner. Kotto portrayed Idi Amin in the 1977 television film Raid on Entebbe. He starred as an auto worker in the 1978 film Blue Collar. The following year he played Parker in the sci-fi–horror film Alien. He followed with a supporting role in the 1980 prison drama Brubaker. In 1983, he guest-starred as mobster Charlie "East Side Charlie" Struthers in The A-Team episode "The Out-of-Towners". In 1987, he appeared in the futuristic sci-fi movie The Running Man, and in 1988, in the action-comedy Midnight Run, in which he portrayed Alonzo Moseley, an FBI agent. A memo from Paramount indicates that Kotto was among those being considered for Jean-Luc Picard in Star Trek: The Next Generation, a role which eventually went to Patrick Stewart.

Kotto was cast as a religious man living in the southwestern desert country in the 1967 episode "A Man Called Abraham" on the syndicated anthology series Death Valley Days, hosted by Robert Taylor. In the story line, Abraham convinces a killer named Cassidy (Rayford Barnes) that Cassidy can change his heart despite past crimes. When Cassidy is sent to the gallows, Abraham provides spiritual solace. Bing Russell also appeared in this segment.

Kotto retired from film acting in the mid-1990s, though he had one final film role in Witless Protection (2008). However, he continued to take on television roles. Kotto portrayed Lieutenant Al Giardello in the long-running television series Homicide: Life on the Street. As a black Sicilian proud of his Italian ancestry, the character was a breakout for television. He has written the book Royalty and also wrote scripts for Homicide. In 2014, he voiced Parker for the video game Alien: Isolation, reprising the role he played in the movie Alien in 1979.

Personal life and death
Kotto's first marriage was to a German immigrant, Rita Ingrid Dittman, whom he married in 1959. They had three children together before divorcing in 1976. Later, Kotto married Toni Pettyjohn, and they also had three children together, before divorcing in 1989. Kotto married his third wife, Tessie Sinahon, who is from the Philippines, in 1998.

Kotto was versed in the Hebrew liturgy and incorporated Jewish prayers at turning points throughout his life. He said his father "instilled Judaism" in him.

Kotto supported Donald Trump in the 2016 and 2020 presidential elections. He also expressed support for Black Lives Matter and QAnon, despite their conflicting views and the conflicts between both groups.

In 2000, he was living in Marmora, Ontario, Canada.

He died at the age of 81 on March 15, 2021, near Manila, Philippines. His wife, who announced the news on Facebook, did not reveal the cause of his death.

Filmography

Films

Television

Video games

In popular culture
A hardcore punk band from California took its name from the actor. He was also mentioned by Childish Gambino on the track 'yaphet kotto (freestyle)'.

References

Further reading
The Royalty: A Spiritual Awakening (1997), autobiography;

External links

1939 births
2021 deaths
20th-century African-American people
20th-century American male actors
21st-century African-American people
21st-century American Jews
21st-century American male actors
African-American Jews
African-American male actors
American male film actors
American male television actors
American people of African-Jewish descent
American people of Cameroonian descent
American people of Panamanian descent
Hispanic and Latino American male actors
Jewish American male actors
Male actors from Baltimore
Male actors from New York City
New York (state) Republicans
People from New York (state)